Frederick Charles Alderdice (November 10, 1871 – February 26, 1936) was a Newfoundland businessman, politician and the last Prime Minister of Newfoundland. Alderdice was born in Belfast, Ireland and was educated at Methodist College Belfast. He moved to Newfoundland in 1886. A prominent St. John's businessman, Alderdice was appointed to the Legislative Council of Newfoundland (the Upper House of the legislature) in 1924 and became leader of the Liberal-Conservative Progressive Party and the dominion's Prime Minister when his cousin Walter Stanley Monroe retired from the post on August 15, 1928. Alderdice's first term as Prime Minister was short-lived, however, as his government lost that year's general election to the Liberals led by Sir Richard Squires.

Alderdice joined with Liberals dissatisfied with Squires to form the United Newfoundland Party with himself as leader. The Great Depression embroiled the dominion in a severe economic crisis which was compounded by corruption in the Squires government taking the dominion to the brink of bankruptcy. Widespread unemployment added to the crisis and resulted in an anti-government riot in St. John's on April 5, 1932. The Squires government collapsed and Alderdice swept to power in the ensuing June election on the promise that if elected, his government would examine the possibility of suspending the constitution and having a commission administer the country until conditions improved. His United Newfoundland Party won 24 seats to only two for the Liberals.

The Alderdice government was unable to deal with the economic crisis and proposed a partial default on the dominion's debts. Britain and Canada (whose currency was shared by Newfoundland) agreed to give the dominion financial aid in exchange for the creation of an Imperial Royal Commission to investigate the dominion's future. The Commission recommended the suspension of responsible government and the institution of an appointed Commission of Government to rule the dominion.

Alderdice was pressured by the British to accept the recommendations without calling a new election or submitting the proposals to a referendum. Alderdice agreed and, at the end of 1933, the legislature voted to accept the recommendations and voted itself out of existence. Alderdice was appointed to the Commission of Government when it was established in February 1934 and served  as Commissioner for Home Affairs and Education in the new Commission of Government as well as Vice-Chairman until his death in 1936.

References

1872 births
1936 deaths
Prime Ministers of the Dominion of Newfoundland
Politicians from Belfast
Politicians from St. John's, Newfoundland and Labrador
People educated at Methodist College Belfast
United Newfoundland Party MHAs
Irish emigrants to pre-Confederation Newfoundland
Members of the Newfoundland Commission of Government
Businesspeople from Belfast
Businesspeople from St. John's, Newfoundland and Labrador